Nate Is Late (French: Oscar et Malika, toujours en retard; German: Voll zu spät!) is an animated television series created by Sylvain Huchet and Peter Saisselin. The series is produced by Watch Next Media and distributed by KidsFirst. The series originally aired on France 4, Super RTL, and Nine Network.

A second season has been confirmed by the production companies of the series, and premiered online on RTS Play on September 21, 2021. The English version of the second season is now showing on Pop in the UK and Ireland.

Premise 
Every morning, Nate and Malika go to school but get sidetracked on adventures that make them late. When they finally arrive at school, Principal Prudence never believes their stories.

Characters 
 Nate (Oscar in French, Mats in German; voiced by Jane U'Brien) – an elementary school-aged boy who is enthusiastic about going on adventures. 
 Malika (voiced by Sarah Aubrey) – an elementary school-aged girl who is Nate's best friend.  Malika acts as the calmer and grounded of the duo, although is prone to making silly decisions as Nate.
 Principal Prudence (voiced by Aubrey) – the principal of Nate and Malika's school who almost always asks Nate and Malika their excuse for being late. 

In addition to the three main characters, other characters are introduced in most episodes as Nate and Malika embark on their journeys.

Episodes

Season 1 (2018-2019)

The season finale, "The Invaders,” focuses on this when Nate, Malika and Principal Prudence end up kidnapped by aliens who try to tap their memories to invade Earth. After they escape, the aliens launch a premature invasion necessitating Nate and Malika to call on all their friends they made through the season to help fend them off.

Season 2 (2021-2022)

Broadcast 
The series was produced for broadcast on France.TV (France), Super RTL (Germany), and Nine Network (Australia). In addition, the series airs on Pop and Pop Max (UK), Cartoon Network (India) and Discovery Kids (MENA).

In the United States, the show is a streaming-exclusive, available on the services Ameba, Kidoodle.TV and BatteryPOP.

References

External links
 

2010s animated television series
2020s animated television series
2018 Australian television series debuts
2018 British television series debuts
2018 French television series debuts
2018 German television series debuts
2018 Australian television series endings
2018 British television series endings
2018 French television series endings
2018 German television series endings
2010s British animated television series
2020s British animated television series
Australian children's animated adventure television series
Australian children's animated fantasy television series
British children's animated adventure television series
British children's animated fantasy television series
French children's animated adventure television series
French children's animated fantasy television series
German children's animated adventure television series
German children's animated fantasy television series
RTL Group
Nine Network original programming
France Télévisions children's television series
Animated television series about children